The brown-dwarf desert is a theorized range of orbits around a star within which brown dwarfs are unlikely to be found as companion objects. This is usually up to 5 AU around solar mass stars. The paucity of brown dwarfs in close orbits was first noted between 1998 and 2000 when a sufficient number of extrasolar planets had been found to perform statistical studies. Astronomers discovered there is a distinct shortage of brown dwarfs within 5 AU of the stars with companions, while there was an abundance of free-floating brown dwarfs being discovered. Subsequent studies have shown that brown dwarfs orbiting within 3–5 AU are found around less than 1% of stars with a mass similar to the Sun. Of the brown dwarfs that were found in the brown-dwarf desert, most were found in multiple systems, suggesting that binarity was a key factor in the creation of brown-dwarf desert inhabitants.

One of the many possible reasons for the existence of the desert relates to planetary (and brown dwarf) migration. If a brown dwarf were to form within 5 AU of its companion star, it could plausibly begin migrating inwards towards the central star and eventually fall into the star itself. That being said, the exact details of migration within a proto-planetary disk are not completely understood, and it is equally plausible that brown dwarf companions to FGK dwarfs would not undergo appreciable migration after their formation. A second possible reason is, depending on which formation paradigm is invoked, that a formation by core accretion should make the formation of higher mass brown dwarfs unlikely, as the gas accretion rate during runaway accretion onto high mass forming objects is reduced due to gap formation in the disk. The limited disk life time then truncates the mass range, limiting the maximum masses to approximately 10 Jupiter masses.
Objects that form further outside (a>80 AU), where the disk is prone to gravitational instabilities, might be able to reach the masses required to cross the planet–brown dwarf threshold. For these objects it might be unlikely to migrate into the inner regions of the disk, however, due to the long type-II migration timescale for massive objects in the brown dwarf mass regime.

See also
 Neptunian Desert

References

Stellar astronomy
-
-